Lovingston High School is a historical school located at Lovingston, Nelson County, Virginia. It is a one-story Colonial Revival-style building that opened in 1931 and originally served grades one through eleven. It consists of a one-and-one-half-story main block with one-story wings.  Behind the main block is the central auditorium with a stage and seven flanking classrooms. Later additions to the rear include four additional classrooms, built about 1945, and a kitchen, built 1951.

It was listed on the National Register of Historic Places in 2003.

References

External links
 National Register of Historic Places Inventory Nomination Form
 Register Nomination: Lovingston High School, Nelson County photograph

National Register of Historic Places in Nelson County, Virginia
Buildings and structures in Nelson County, Virginia
Defunct schools in Virginia
School buildings completed in 1931
Colonial Revival architecture in Virginia
School buildings on the National Register of Historic Places in Virginia